The St. Catharines municipal election of 2003 was held on 10 November 2003 to determine a mayor, regional and city councillors and school trustees in the city of St. Catharines, Ontario.

Mayoral results

Niagara Regional Council

Electors could vote for six candidates.
Percentages are determined in relation to the total number of votes.

St. Catharines City Council

Ward 1 - Merriton

Ward 2 - St. Andrew's

Ward 3 - St. George's

Ward 4 - St. Patrick's

Ward 5 - Grantham

Ward 6 - Port Dalhousie

Footnotes

2003 Ontario municipal elections
2003